Schubert: Thematic Catalogue of all his Works in Chronological Order, also known as the Deutsch catalogue, is a numbered list of all compositions by Franz Schubert compiled by Otto Erich Deutsch. Since its first publication in 1951, Deutsch (abbreviated as D or D.) numbers are used for the unique identification of Schubert's compositions.

1951 edition
The Deutsch catalogue was first published in London in 1951 by J. M. Dent & Sons, as Schubert: Thematic Catalogue of all his Works in Chronological Order, compiled by O. E. Deutsch, in collaboration with Donald R. Wakeling.

1978 edition: NSE VIII/4
In 1978, as part VIII Supplement / Volume 4 of the New Schubert Edition (NSE), an updated version of the catalogue was published in German.

Later versions
The original 1951 edition (in English) was re-issued several times, for instance in the United States by W. W. Norton. The 1978 version, published by Bärenreiter, had a double objective: it was not only a list of Schubert's works as such, it was also the compendium of all scores published by that publisher in the New Schubert Edition.

New versions in English
In 1995 Dover Publications republished the 1951 edition, with updates derived from scholarship that had been published since 1951.

New versions in German
From 1983 compact versions of the catalogue appeared, edited by Werner Aderhold and others.

Changes to the numbering of Schubert's works were minor in these later editions.

References

Sources
 Thematisches Verzeignis der im Druck erschienenen Compositionen von Franz Schubert. Vienna: Diabelli, 1852.
 Gustav Nottebohm. Thematisches Verzeignis der im Druck erschienenen Werke von F. Schubert. Vienna: Schreiber, 1874.
 Otto Erich Deutsch in collaboration with Donald R. Wakeling. Schubert: Thematic Catalogue of all his Works in Chronological Order. London: Dent — New York: W. W. Norton, 1951.
 Maurice J. E. Brown. "The Musician's Bookshelf. 'Schubert: Thematic Catalogue of all his Works in Chronological Order.' By Otto Erich Deutsch." in The Musical Times Vol. 92, No. 1300, June 1951.
 Otto Erich Deutsch. The Schubert Catalogue: Corrections and Additions. University of Michigan, 1953.
 Reinhard Van Hoorickx. "Franz Schubert (1797–1828) List of the Dances in Chronological Order" in Revue belge de Musicologie/Belgisch Tijdschrift voor Muziekwetenschap, Vol. 25, No. 1/4, 1971
Reinhard Van Hoorickx. "Thematic Catalogue of Schubert's Works: New Additions, Corrections and Notes" in Revue belge de Musicologie/Belgisch Tijdschrift voor Muziekwetenschap, Vol. 28/30, 1974—1976.
 Otto Erich Deutsch, with revisions by Werner Aderhold and others. Franz Schubert, thematisches Verzeichnis seiner Werke in chronologischer Folge (New Schubert Edition Series VIII Supplement, Volume 4). Kassel: Bärenreiter, 1978. ISMN 9790006305148 — 
Robert Winter. "Cataloguing Schubert" in 19th Century Music, November 1979
Eva Badura-Skoda and Peter Branscombe. Schubert Studies: Problems of Style and Chronology. Cambridge University Press, 1982.
 Otto Erich Deutsch, edited by Werner Aderhold, Walther Dürr, Arnold Feil. Franz Schubert: Werkverzeichnis — Der Kleine Deutsch. Kassel: Bärenreiter, 1983.  – . (concise edition)
 Otto Erich Deutsch, The Schubert Thematic Catalogue. New York: Dover Publications, 1995.  – 
 Barry S. Brook, Richard J. Viano. Thematic Catalogues in Music: An Annotated Bibliography — second edition, pp. 409–413. Pendragon Press, 1997. 
 Werner Aderhold (ed.) Franz Schubert: Deutsch-Verzeichnis — Studienausgabe. Kassel: Bärenreiter, 2012. ISMN 9790006315864 —

External links
 Franz Schubert, Thematisches Verzeichnis seiner Werke in chronologischer Folge on-line copy of the 1978 version at archive.org
 Schubert Database by Neue Schubert-Ausgabe
 List of works by Franz Schubert at International Music Score Library Project
 555 on-line autographs of compositions by Schubert, ordered by D. number at schubert-online.at by Austrian Academy of Sciences (OAW)
  Franz Schubert: Catalogue des oeuvres at 
  Franz SCHUBERT: Catalogo delle composizioni at 

 
Catalogue
Schubert Thematic Catalogue